Bela ampla is a species of sea snail, a marine gastropod mollusk in the family Mangeliidae. It is found in the Arctic Ocean.

Description
The original description of this species by Edgar Albert Smith was only phrased in comparative terms and lacked an image. It was redescribed by Stockland in 1987. Stockland suggested that this species should be placed in the genus Obesotoma. The holotype is in the British Museum (Natural History) no. 198230.

The shell is pale yellowish grey in color. The body whorl is large. The aperture is elongate–oval and has an evenly curved outer lip. The columella is curved in the middle and rather straight otherwise.

Distribution
This marine species occurs in the Arctic Ocean, possibly including the Bering Strait.

References

 Smith, Edgar A. "Report on the zoological collections made in the Indo-Pacific Ocean during the voyage of HMS Alert 1881–1882." London: British Museum (1884): 487–508.

External links
  Tucker, J.K. 2004 Catalog of recent and fossil turrids (Mollusca: Gastropoda). Zootaxa 682:1-1295.

ampla
Fauna of the Arctic Ocean
Taxa named by Edgar Albert Smith
Gastropods described in 1884